Danlaba Mendy (born 20 February 1976) is a French former football striker  He played for Grêmio FBPA in the Brazilian Championship and the Copa Mercosur in 1998, after which he spent four seasons with Troyes AC in the French Ligue 1.

Born in Trappes, Danlaba moved with his family to the United States as a child. He played youth football at the IMG Academy, and then had an internship at Brazilian club Grêmio. Due to Grêmio's lack of available players, Danlaba was used in a 1998 Campeonato Gaúcho match. He would make a few more league appearances for the club, but never signed a full contract.

References

1978 births
Living people
French footballers
Footballers from Paris
Expatriate footballers in Brazil
Association football midfielders
Grêmio Foot-Ball Porto Alegrense players
ES Troyes AC players